Khangir is a rural locality (a selo) in Yeravninsky District, Republic of Buryatia, Russia. The population was 73 as of 2010. There is 1 street.

References 

Rural localities in Yeravninsky District